Bujin can refer to:

 Bujin, a village in Iran
 Bujin (Dragon Ball), a character in a 1993 Japanese fantasy martial arts film

 Cristina Ioana Bujin (born 1988), Romanian triple jumper